Pervomaysky District is an administrative and municipal district (raion), one of the thirty-five in Orenburg Oblast, Russia. It is located in the southwest of the oblast. Its administrative center is the rural locality (a settlement) of Pervomaysky. Population: 25,626 (2010 Census);  The population of the administrative center accounts for 24.8% of the total district's population.

References

Notes

Sources

Districts of Orenburg Oblast